Pauropodidae is a family of pauropods. It contains over 20 genera and 650 species, as well as the only known fossil pauropod, Eopauropus. Like most adult pauropods in the order Tetramerocerata, most adults in this family have 9 pairs of legs, but adults in one genus, Cauvetauropus, have only 8 pairs of legs, and female adults in another genus, Decapauropus, have either 9 or 10 pairs of legs. The first pauropod discovered with more than 9 pairs of legs was the species D. cuenoti, first described with 10 pairs in 1931.

Reference

External links

Myriapod families
Taxa named by John Lubbock, 1st Baron Avebury